Rimbach (Ben-Stadt) in the Odenwald is a municipality in the Bergstraße district in southern Hesse, Germany.

Geography

Location
The community lies in the Odenwald some 30 km north of Heidelberg and about 35 km northeast of Mannheim. It is found on Bundesstraße 38, and through it flows the Weschnitz.

Neighbouring communities
Rimbach borders in the north on the community of Fürth, in the east on the community of Grasellenbach, in the southeast on the community of Wald-Michelbach, in the south on the community of Mörlenbach and in the west on the town of Heppenheim.

Constituent communities
Rimbach’s Ortsteile are Albersbach, Lauten-Weschnitz, Mitlechtern, Münschbach, Unter-Mengelbach and Zotzenbach.

Climate
Owing to its location in Bergstraße district, a mild climate prevails in Rimbach, which often leads to what in Germany is a very early blossoming of the almond trees.

History
In 795, Rimbach had its first documentary mention, and in 1995 it celebrated its 1,200-year jubilee.

Politics

Community council

The municipal election in 2011 yielded the following results:

Mayor
Mayor Holger Schmitt (PuB) was elected in 2012 with 69.1% of the vote.

Town partnerships
 Colwich-Haywood, Staffordshire, England, United Kingdom since 1983
 Thourotte, Oise, France since 1983

Economy and infrastructure

Transport
Rimbach lies on the Weschnitztalbahn (railway) from Weinheim to Fürth in the Odenwald.

Moreover, Bundesstraße 38 runs through Rimbach. The Saukopftunnel, dedicated in 1999, made it possible to detour around Birkenau on Bundesstraße 38a, improving Rimbach’s road link with Weinheim and the Autobahn network. A new bottleneck, however, has cropped up at Mörlenbach, whose bypass is being planned.

Education

 5 kindergartens
 1 daycare centre
 3 primary schools
 1 Hauptschule and Realschule (RBS)
 1 Gymnasium (Martin-Luther-Schule)

Culture and sightseeing

Theatre
 K.U.S.S. - Martin-Luther-Schule students’ theatre
 Jugendbühne - Martin-Luther-Schule students’ theatre
 Center Stage - English Theater - Martin-Luther-Schule students’ theatre
 Grünes Theater - KSG Mitlechtern

Regular events
 Rimbescher Kerwe (church consecration festival)
 Rimbacher Pfingstmarkt (Whitsun market)
 Rimbacher Herbst (Autumn)
 Rimbacher Frühling (Spring)
 Schwarzwurzelfastnacht in Rimbach (“Black Sausage Carnival”)
 Nikolausparty in Rimbach

Youth groups
 Katholische Junge Gemeinde (KJG) St. Elisabeth Rimbach (a tent camp every year)
 Christliche Pfadfinderschaft im CPD (Scouting)
 Jugendfeuerwehr (youth fire brigade)
 Jugendrotkreuz (Red Cross)

References

External links

 

Bergstraße (district)